Marie Lorenz is an artist in Brooklyn, New York. Her work focuses on discarded objects in urban spaces, such as the rivers of New York. She also navigates these waterways and records her experiences with video and photography.

Career 
In 2015, Lorenz created an exhibition for Artpace in San Antonio, Texas. It consisted of sculptures made from casts of debris found on the coastline. She has also exhibited at the Everson Museum of Art.

Lorenz's current project is called the Tide and Current Taxi. She studies the tides and uses them to propel her homemade rowboat around New York, often taking passengers.

References 

Living people
Abstract sculptors
Year of birth missing (living people)